Giansanti is a surname. Notable people with the surname include:

Gianni Giansanti (1956–2009), Italian photographer
Mirko Giansanti (born 1976), Italian motorcycle road racer